Mayfly is a short film. It was written and directed by Michael Bodie, and deals with the difficult subject matter of assisted suicide and dying.  Bodie graduated as a writer / director, from UC Davis with a bachelor's degree in dramatic arts. Mayfly was his fifth short film.

Cast
Charlotte Stewart  as Barbara
Andrew Masset  as Richard
Lucy Owen  as Sam's Daughter
Judith Montgomery  as Samantha
Tim Hodgin  as Carl

External links
 
 Mayfly at Vimeo.com
 Michael Brodie's Home Page

2008 films
2008 drama films
American short films
2000s English-language films